Ahmed El Agouz (born 23 July 1966) is an Egyptian football manager. In 2020, he was appointed as the General coach of Ismaily SC.

Managerial statistics

References

Living people
1966 births
Egyptian football managers
People from Sharqia Governorate
Khaleej FC managers
Ismaily SC managers
Saudi First Division League managers
Egyptian expatriate football managers
Expatriate football managers in Saudi Arabia
Egyptian expatriate sportspeople in Saudi Arabia